Axel Rudolf Mauritz Wall (19 January 1826 – 20 August 1893) was a Swedish publisher and journalist who founded Dagens Nyheter in 1864.

Biography   
Wall was born at Sevalla in Västmanland County,  Sweden.
He was the son of the merchant sailor Erik Gustaf Saxholm and Johanna Fredrika Chagelin. He grew up under modest circumstances, mainly with his mother. After receiving private tuition, he got into contact with Lars Johan Hierta (1801–1872), the founder of Aftonbladet, in whose office he began to work as a boy, continuing his education in the meantime. He advanced in Hierta's employ and was eventually given editorial work. In 1846, he took over a printshop which he had previously rented for two years, and which now became known as the Wall printshop  (Wallska tryckeriet). The company succeeded under his leadership and in 1847, he started the Sunday news Söndagstidningen  and the next year a weekly magazine for children and youth Veckoskrift för barn och ungdom. As a consequence, he was recognized as a burgess of the city in 1858. 

Some failed dealings caused a bankruptcy in 1859 and forced him to embark on a journalistic career to support himself. He began at Göteborgs Handels- och Sjöfartstidning, and later returned to Aftonbladet. He also started the book series Sveriges handelskalender and translated political writings.
When Wall established Dagens Nyheter in 1864, there was no other morning paper in Sweden. He remained editor-in-chief until 1889. The company was reorganized to become a public limited corporation in 1874, Dagens Nyheter AB. Wall became its first chairman and remained so until his death in 1893.

Person life
In 1852, he had married Rosalia Löwenström (1830-1897).
Rudolf Walls died during 1893 and was buried at Norra begravningsplatsen in Stockholm.

See also
 Sveriges Handelskalendar

References

Other sources
 Hasselberg, Gudmar, Rudolf Wall. Dagens Nyheters skapare (1944)

1826 births
1893 deaths
People from  Västmanland County
Swedish newspaper publishers (people)
19th-century Swedish journalists
Male journalists
19th-century male writers
Dagens Nyheter editors